Sir Spencer Harcourt Butler  (1 August 1869 – 2 March 1938) was an officer of the Indian Civil Service who was the leading British official in Burma for much of his career, serving as Lieutenant-Governor (1915–17 and 1922–23) and later Governor of Burma (1923–27). 

He also served as Lieutenant Governor of the United Provinces of Agra and Oudh from 1918 to 1921 and later was the first governor of United Provinces of Agra and Oudh from 1921 to 1922.

Life and career 
Butler was born on 1 August 1869 in Middlesex, England and died on 2 March 1938 in London, at age 68. He was the brother of Montagu Sherard Dawes Butler and Geoffrey G. Butler.

Educated at Harrow School and Balliol College, Oxford, Butler entered the Indian Civil Services soon afterwards, in 1890. He served as governor of United Provinces from 3 January 1921 to 21 December 1922, and was followed by Sir William Sinclair Marris. Butler later went on to serve as Governor of Burma from 2 January 1923 to 20 December 1927; he had already been lieutenant-governor of Burma from 28 October 1915 to 22 September 1917, and held the title briefly again from 21 December 1922 to 2 January 1923. On that date, the position became that of "Governor".

The Government of India in 1910 had appointed Butler as the first Member for Education with a seat on the Viceroy's Executive Council. He was also the first president of Delhi Gymkhana, founded in 1913.

Butler was appointed a Companion of the Order of the Star of India (CSI) in 1909, knighted as a Knight Commander (KCSI) of the same order in 1911, and promoted to Knight Grand Commander (GCSI) of the order in 1928. He was appointed a Companion of the Order of the Indian Empire (CIE) in November 1901, and was promoted to a Knight Grand Commander (GCIE) of the same order in 1923.

The Harcourt Butler Technological Institute, Kanpur established in 1921 was named after him which was granted a university status in September 2016. Also Harcourt Butler Higher Secondary School (now known as Harcourt Butler Senior Secondary School), New Delhi was also named after him in 1917. It was earlier called Bengali Boys School.

Butler helped the opening of the University of Medicine 1, Yangon, on 2 February 1927. From 1927 to 1929 he chaired the Butler Committee on the governance of the British Raj in relation to the princely states.

Family
Butler married Florence Katherine Wright  in London in 1894. They had one son, Victor Spencer, born in 1900.

References

Links
  
 Myanmar (Burma), worldstatesmen.org. Retrieved 29 March 2016.
 Speeches 1921

1869 births
1938 deaths
Knights Grand Commander of the Order of the Star of India
Knights Grand Commander of the Order of the Indian Empire
Knights of the Order of St John
Administrators in British Burma
Alumni of Balliol College, Oxford
Indian Civil Service (British India) officers
People educated at Harrow School
People from Kanpur